Ben Ramsey is an American retired screenwriter and film director, most commonly known as the screenwriter of The Big Hit (starring Mark Wahlberg) and Dragonball Evolution.

Career
Ramsey began his career in Hollywood in 1996 when he wrote the Mark Wahlberg feature, The Big Hit for Sony Pictures. He would later go on to write Dragonball Evolution for 20th Century Fox. He directed the hit DTV action films Blood and Bone and Love and a Bullet which Sony also distributed. Most recently he directed the short film Black Salt for Ratti Entertainment and his own company Ramcity Productions.

Dragonball Evolution

In 2016, Ramsey issued a public apology for the film, claiming the film "marked a very painful creative point in my life". He writes: "To have something with my name on it as the writer be so globally reviled is gut wrenching. To receive hate mail from all over the world is heartbreaking. (...) I went into the project chasing after a big payday, not as a fan of the franchise but as a businessman taking on an assignment. I have learned that when you go into a creative endeavor without passion you come out with sub-optimal results, and sometimes flat out garbage. So I’m not blaming anyone for Dragonball but myself."

Filmography

References

 
 Scribe's getting 'Roses'
 Ramsey rolls 'Dragonball Z'

External links
 
 Black Salt
 Interface Official website

Living people
Year of birth missing (living people)
Place of birth missing (living people)
American screenwriters
African-American film directors
African-American film producers
African-American screenwriters
American film producers
American male screenwriters
21st-century African-American people
African-American male writers